{{Infobox military installation
|name=Krujë CastleKalaja e Krujës
|partof=
|location=Krujë,Northcentral Albania
|map_type=Albania
|map_alt=
|coordinates= 
|map_size=180
|image=Castillo de Kruja, Kruja, Albania, 2014-04-18, DD 11.JPG
|image_size=280px
|caption=The Inside of Kruje Castle|type=
| controlledby  =    Principality of Arbanon   Kingdom of Albania    Principality of Albania   Principality of Kastrioti   League of Lezhë   
| materials     =  
|battles= 
| height        = 
| used          = 
| condition     = 
| ownership     = 
| open_to_public = Yes
| events        = 
| built        = 5th Century 
}}
The Krujë Castle is a castle in the city of Krujë, Albania and the center of Skanderbeg's rebellion against the Ottoman Empire. Inside the castle is the Teqe of Dollme of the Bektashi (an Islamic Sufi sect), the National Skanderbeg Museum, the remains of the Fatih Sultan Mehmed mosque and its minaret, an ethnographic museum and a Turkish bath.

 History 

Krujë castle was built in the 5th or 6th century, perched above the city with the same name as today. During the Albanian Revolt of 1432-1436 the city was unsuccessfully besieged by Andrea Thopia and Ottoman rule was restored. After Skanderbeg's rebellion in 1443 the castle withstood three massive sieges from the Turks respectively in 1450, 1466 and 1467 with garrisons usually no larger than 2,000-3,000 men under Skanderbeg's command. Mehmed II "The Conqueror" himself could not break the castle's small defenses until 1478, 10 years after the death of Skanderbeg. Today it is a center of tourism in Albania, and a source of inspiration to Albanians.

 Museums in the castle 
 National Museum "Gjergj Kastrioti Skenderbeu" 

The Albanian people are identified with the history of Kruje Castle. This castle is one of the most visited places in Albania. Within the fortress is located one of the main attractions, the National Museum "George Castroti Skanderbeg" (Muzeu Kombetar "Gjergj Kastrioti Skenderbeu" in Albanian). This museum was built in early 1980s by architects Pranvera Masha and Pirro Vaso. Inside the museum a lot of original bibliography, documents, objects and authentic reproductions that represent the history of Albanian people in the fifteenth century are displayed. This museum has become an icon of the city's skyline.

 The Ethnographic Museum 
Another attraction for tourists is the Ethnographic Museum'', located in the south side of Kruje Castle. This museum is designed based on a typical house of 19th century. It reveals the sustainable methods of tools, food, drink and furniture production in a typical household. There are also objects and old wood and metal supplies that represent the lifestyle back then in the castle.

Legacy 
The castle is depicted on the reverses of the Albanian 1000 lekë banknote of 1992–1996, and of the 5000 lekë banknote issued since 1996.

See also 
Krujë
List of castles in Albania
Tourism in Albania
Albanoi
History of Albania
Skanderbeg Museum
Illyrians

References

External links
 The story of the Castle of Krujë

Castles in Albania
Buildings and structures in Krujë
Tourist attractions in Durrës County